Magaly Quintana Pereyra (28 May 1952  – 5 May 2019) was a Nicaraguan feminist historian and activist. She was director of Catholic Women for the Right to Choose, advocating for the right to therapeutic abortion following its ban in Nicaragua in 2006. She also led advocacy opposing violence against women, raising awareness of femicide in the country. In 2018, she joined the anti-government protests.

Quintana was born 28 May 1952. She attended La Asunción for high school, then entered university, becoming a student leader. She joined the Nicaraguan Revolution, then in 1982 began working in feminist organizing.

She died of a stroke on 5 May 2019, aged 66.

References

Nicaraguan feminists
Nicaraguan historians
1952 births
2019 deaths
Catholic feminists
Abortion-rights activists
Nicaraguan revolutionaries
Women in war in Central America
21st-century Nicaraguan women politicians
21st-century Nicaraguan politicians
People of the Nicaraguan Revolution
Women in warfare post-1945
Nicaraguan women's rights activists
Nicaraguan women activists